Druzhny is a rural locality (a settlement) in Enemskoye Urban Settlement of Takhtamukaysky District, the Republic of Adygea, Russia. The population was 448 as of 2018. There are 2 streets.

Geography 
The settlement is located 12 km northwest of Takhtamukay (the district's administrative centre) by road. Enem is the nearest rural locality.

References 

Rural localities in Takhtamukaysky District